A Scotch pie or mutton pie is a small, double-crust meat pie, traditionally filled with minced mutton but now generally beef, sometimes lamb. It may also be known as a shell pie or mince pie (although the latter term is ambiguous) to differentiate it from other varieties of savoury pie, such as the steak pie, steak and kidney pie, steak-and-tattie (potato) pie, and so forth. The Scotch pie originated in Scotland, where it is simply called "a pie" but can be found in other parts of the United Kingdom, and is widely sold all over Canada. They are often sold alongside other types of hot food in football grounds, traditionally accompanied by a drink of Bovril, resulting in the occasional reference to football pies.

The traditional filling of mutton is often highly spiced with pepper and other ingredients and is placed inside a shell of hot water crust pastry. It is baked in a round, straight-sided tin, about 8 cm in diameter and 4 cm high, and the top "crust" (which is soft) is placed about 1 cm lower than the rim to make a space for adding accompaniments such as mashed potatoes, baked beans, brown sauce, gravy or an egg.

Scotch pies are often served hot by take-away restaurants, bakeries and at outdoor events. The hard crust of the pie enables it to be eaten by hand with no wrapping. Typically there is a round hole of about 7.5mm in the centre of the top crust.

World Scotch Pie Championship 
Every year, since 1999, Scottish Bakers, a trade association, hold the World Championship Scotch Pie Awards. The winner of the Scotch pie section of the competition is judged to be the World Champion.

See also
 Rabbit pie
 Killie pie
 List of lamb dishes
 List of pies, tarts and flans

References

External links

British pies
Canadian cuisine
Lamb dishes
Potato dishes
Savoury pies
Scottish cuisine